The 2005 Korean FA Cup, known as the 2005 Hana Bank FA Cup, was the tenth edition of the Korean FA Cup.

Bracket

Round of 32

Round of 16

Quarter-finals

Semi-finals

Final

Awards
Source:

See also
2005 in South Korean football
2005 K League
2005 K2 League
2005 Korean League Cup

References

External links
Official website
Fixtures & Results at KFA

2005
2005 domestic association football cups
2005 in South Korean football